Jean-Christophe Keck is a French musicologist and conductor, born in Briançon, in 1964. He is particularly noted as a specialist in the works of Jacques Offenbach, and is the director of the complete critical edition in progress, named after both, Offenbach Edition Keck (OEK).

Biography 
As a child he played tuba in the Briançon town band and after early studies at the école de musique de Briançon he attended for two years the Conservatoire de Marseille before entering the Conservatoire national supérieur de musique de Paris. There he followed courses in conducting with Jean-Sébastien Bérault, musicology and composition with Pierre Villette, vocal studies (tenor) with Christiane Eda-Pierre, and piano. He was struck early by a passion for the music of Offenbach, through the TV series Les Folies Offenbach with Michel Serrault, the recording of Belle Hélène conducted by René Leibowitz and that of Les Contes d'Hoffmann conducted by Pierre-Michel Le Conte, with Heinz Rehfuss. He also singles out conductors Jules Gressier, Marcel Cariven and Jean Doussard who managed to create miracles of music under difficult conditions.

Alongside a singing career, in which he was engaged at the (Opéra Bastille, Festival d'Aix-en-Provence, Opéra de Lyon), he also began to conduct. He was involved in film, radio and television including some of his own compositions.

He is the musical director of Pro 05, the chamber orchestra of the Hautes-Alpes, as well as the Festival lyrique des châteaux de Bruniquel (Tarn-et-Garonne). Since 2004, he has directed the Offenbach concerts of the Orchestre des Concerts Pasdeloup. In April 2012 he conducted Ba-ta-clan and Mesdames de la Halle for the Academy of Music Hanns Eisler Berlin.

For some years Jean-Christophe Keck has been leading the work to create a critical edition of all the works of Offenbach. The Offenbach Edition Keck is being published by Boosey & Hawkes. Already Keck's editions of La Périchole, La Grande-Duchesse de Gérolstein, La Vie parisienne and Les Brigands have been successfully performed. His edition of the 1858 version of Orphée aux enfers has been highly praised. His researches have led him to acquire many important related documents and manuscripts. In a 2013 article he predicted that the edition OEK would when complete comprise 43 volumes, although he added "that won't be in my lifetime".

In 2002 the Festival de Radio-France Montpellier saw the recreation of Offenbach's grand opéra romantique Les Fées du Rhin in Keck's edition.  The revival of this important work won various prizes including the Prix Michel Garcin of the Académie du disque lyrique.

The Opéra-Théâtre de Metz created his opéra-bouffe Monsieur de Chimpanzé on a libretto by Jules Verne in November 2005, conducted by Dominique Trottein. Although a work set to the libretto had been premiered at the Bouffes-Parisiens in 1858, the music had been lost, and Keck composed an entirely new score.

Keck is also a producer and presenter for France Musique.

Discography 
as conductor
Ballade Symphonique, Orchestre national de Montpellier, Accord, 2005 
Le Financier et le Savetier, et autre délices, Orchestre des Concerts Pasdeloup, Accord, 2007

as musicologist
Les Fées du Rhin with the Orchestre national de Montpellier, Friedemann Layer (conductor), Accord, 2003
La Grande-Duchesse de Gérolstein with Felicity Lott, Yann Beuron and François Le Roux; Marc Minkowski (conductor), Virgin Classics, 2005
Concerto pour violoncelle et orchestre « Concerto militaire » with Jérôme Pernoo; Marc Minkowski (conductor), Archiv Produktion, 2006

References

External links
 OEK site, critical edition of the complete works of Offenbach

1964 births
Living people
People from Briançon
20th-century French musicologists
21st-century French musicologists
French male conductors (music)
Conservatoire de Paris alumni
Radio France people
21st-century French conductors (music)
21st-century French male musicians